San Pedro is one of the 22 parishes located in the Libertador Bolivarian Municipality and one of 32 of Caracas, Venezuela.

References

Parishes of Capital District (Venezuela)